is a railway station in Ōmura, Nagasaki, Japan, operated by the Kyushu Railway Company (JR Kyushu).

Lines
Shin-Ōmura Station is served by the Nishi Kyushu Shinkansen and the Ōmura Line.

Platforms
The station consists of 1 side platforms for the Omura Line and 2 side platforms for the Nishi Kyushu Shinkansen totalling to three tracks.

History 
Shin-Ōmura Station opened on 23 September 2022 when the Nishi Kyushu Shinkansen began revenue service.

References

External links

 Station website (in Japanese)

Railway stations in Nagasaki Prefecture
Railway stations in Japan opened in 2022